Tilhar railway station (station code: TLH) is a railway station on the Lucknow–Moradabad line located in the City of Tilhar in, Uttar Pradesh, India. Since 1940 British government For Tehsil Tilhar Use It is under the administrative control of the Moradabad Division of the Northern Railway Zone of the Indian Railways, and was formerly part of the Oudh and Rohilkhand Railway. In 2017, passengers claiming they had a right to travel for free stopped a train at Tilhar.

References

External links
 (three photos)
 

 

Railway stations in Uttar Pradesh
Shahjahanpur district